Ralph Richardson (1902–1983) was an English actor.

Ralph Richardson may also refer to:

Ralph Richardson (politician born 1812) (1812–1897), Member of the New Zealand Legislative Council (1853–1856)
Ralph Richardson (politician born 1848) (1848–1895), Member of the New Zealand Parliament (1871–1873)
Ralph Richardson (chancellor) (born 1940), former chancellor of Atlantic Baptist University (now Crandall University) in Canada
Ralph Richardson (South African cricketer), (born 1963), brother of Dave Richardson
Ralph Richardson (geologist) (1845–1933), Scottish lawyer and geologist